Kenneth William Michael Haigh (25 March 1931 – 4 February 2018) was an English actor. He first came to public recognition for playing the role of Jimmy Porter in the play Look Back in Anger in 1956 opposite Mary Ure in London's West End theatre. Haigh's performance in the role on stage was critically acclaimed as a prototype dramatic working-class anti-hero in post-Second World War English drama.

Early life
Born in Mexborough, West Riding of Yorkshire, Haigh studied drama at the Central School of Speech and Drama, at the time based at the Royal Albert Hall in London.

Career
He played the central role of Jimmy Porter in the premiere production of John Osborne's play Look Back in Anger in 1956 at the Royal Court Theatre. His performance in a 1958 Broadway theatre production of that play so moved one young woman in the audience that she mounted the stage and slapped him in mid-performance. For the film version released in 1959, he was passed over in favour of Richard Burton. Coincidentally, he went on to portray the explorer and adventurer Richard Francis Burton in the BBC production of The Search for the Nile. He also briefly appeared in the Beatles' film A Hard Day's Night (1964).

Later he portrayed Joe Lampton, a character created by John Braine in the novel Room at the Top, in the television series Man at the Top (1970–72) and the spin-off film Man at the Top (1973).
Also in 1973 he released an LP entitled How To Handle A Woman.

Haigh made occasional appearances on television. His most recognisable appearance is that of time-travelling Flight Lieutenant William Terrence Decker, in The Twilight Zone episode "The Last Flight" (1960). He had already played, three years before, another pilot, in High Flight (film). 
He also portrayed Pat Casey in Lionel Bart's Maggie May.

Personal life
Haigh married the West Indies model Myrna Stephens in 1974. They divorced in 1985, but remained good friends; she nursed him through his final years of ill-health.

Death
Haigh died on 4 February 2018, aged 86. He had spent his last years in a nursing home after oxygen deprivation led to brain damage in 2003, following his accidental swallowing of a bone in a restaurant in Soho.

Filmography

Theatre

 Othello (Drogheda, 1952)
 The Archers Stage Play (Various 1953)
 Dear Little Liz (Open Air Theatre, Regent's Park, 1955) 
 Look Back in Anger (Royal Court Theatre, London, 1956) - Jimmy Porter
 The Mulberry Bush (1956) - Peter Lord
 The Crucible (1956) - Rev John Hale
 Cards of Identity (1956) - Beaufort
 Caligula (Broadway, 1960; Phoenix Theatre, London, 1964) - Caligula
 Zoo Story (Arts Theatre, London, 1961) 
 Altona (Royal Court and Saville Theatres, 1961) - Franz von Gerlach
 The Collection (The Aldwych, 1962)
 Playing with Fire (The Aldwych, 1962)
 Julius Caesar (Stratford, RSC 1962) - Mark Antony
 Maggie May (Adelphi Theatre, London, 1964) - Patrick Casey
 Too Good To Be True (Edinburgh Festival, 1965) - Burglar
 Prometheus Unbound (Yale University Theatre, 1967) - Prometheus
 Henry IV (Yale, 1967)
 The Hotel in Amsterdam (Duke of York's Theatre, London, 1969) - Laurie
 Much Ado About Nothing (Manchester, 1969) - Benedick
 Equus (Citadel Theatre, Edmonton, Alberta, 1969–70) - Dysart 
 Prometheus Unbound (Mermaid Theatre, 1971) - Prometheus
 Marching Song (Mermaid Theatre, London, 1974) - Rupert Foster
 The Father (Haymarket, Leicester, 1975) - Father
 California Suite (Eugene O’Neill Theatre, Broadway, 1977) - Replacement: William, Sidney, Stu
 The Aspern Papers (Chichester Festival, 1978)
 Twelfth Night (Stratford, CT, 1979) - Malvolio
 Julius Caesar (Stratford, CT, 1979) - Brutus 
 The Tempest (Stratford, CT, 1979) - Prospero
 Clothes for a Summer Hotel (Broadway, 1980) - F Scott Fitzgerald
 Othello (Young Vic, London, 1982) - Othello

 Television 

 Alfred Hitchcock Presents "Specialty of the House" (1959) - Mr. Costain; "Banquo's Chair" (1959) - John Bedford
 Danger Man "Josetta" (1960) - Juan
 Strange Report (1969) - “Hostage.If you won’t learn,Die!”.
 Search for the Nile (1971)
 Man at the Top (Thames Television, 1971–73) - Joe Lampton
 Moll Flanders (ITV, 1975) - Jemmy Earle
 Hazlitt in Love (1977) - William Hazlitt
 Maybury (BBC, 1981)
 The Testament of John (1984)
 The Fourth Floor (Thames Television, 1986) - George Payne
 The Blackheath Poisonings'' (1992) -  Charles Russell

References

External links
 
 
 

1931 births
2018 deaths
English male film actors
English male television actors
Alumni of the Royal Central School of Speech and Drama
People from Mexborough
Actors from Doncaster